Elachista orestella is a moth of the family Elachistidae. It is found in North America in Alberta, Labrador, New Brunswick, Newfoundland and Labrador, Quebec, Yukon, Alaska, Illinois, Massachusetts, Minnesota, Nebraska, New Jersey, New York and Pennsylvania.

The length of the forewings is 3.1–5.7 mm. The forewings are broad. The costa in the basal sixth is grey, while the ground colour is white, irregularly dusted with grey tips of scales especially in distal part. The hindwings are shining light grey and translucent. The underside of the wings is grey.

References

orestella
Moths of North America
Moths described in 1908
Taxa named by August Busck